Vincent Makori is the anchor of Africa 54, Voice of America’s English television live news magazine show that broadcasts daily from Washington D.C. The program brings information about Africa, the United States, and the world to viewers across Africa.

Africa 54 features news, interviews with newsmakers, analysts, American and African government officials and everyday citizens presenting a variety of opinions on issues affecting the African continent.

Before joining the Voice of America, Vincent Makori was an Editor and on air talent with Germany's international broadcasting agency, Deutsche Welle in Cologne. He joined Deutsche Well in 1998 after having worked as a reporter, News Editor, anchor and talk show host with Kenya Broadcasting Corporation television and radio. As a reporter, Vincent interviewed then president George W. Bush in 2003 and thereafter travelled with the president and the White House press corps on a five nation trip to Africa. Vincent has also interviewed a number of sitting and former African presidents including then president of Ghana, John Kufuor; Hifikepunye Pohamba of Namibia; Bingu wa Mutharika of Malawi along with prominent scholars, celebrities and experts of various fields.

Early life
Vincent Makori hails from the Kisii region of Kenya but grew up in the capital, Nairobi. He earned a postgraduate diploma in mass communication from the University of Nairobi. Vincent holds a bachelor's degree in English literature from Moi University, in Eldoret, Kenya.  He has attended numerous journalism training  programs in Kenya, Germany and the US.

Career
Vincent Makori worked with Kenya Broadcasting Corporation's Radio and TV as reporter, editor and anchor for four years. While at KBC, Makori also hosted two prime time live TV shows, Face to Face and the current affairs program Mambo Leo. Later he left for Germany and joined Deutsche Welle Radio in 1998.  In 2001 Vincent was hired by the Voice of America (VOA) and moved to Washington D.C.

Notable reporting and interviews
During his career, Vincent has covered a wide range of stories including, president George W. Bush's trip to five African nations; the Africa Union Summit in Lusaka, Zambia, the UN General Assembly in New York; International Trade and Technology Fairs in Berlin and Hanover Germany, The International AIDS Conference, in Mexico City, Mexico, and the G-20 Summit in Pittsburgh, Pennsylvania. In January 2014, Mr. Makori interviewed Dr. Thomas Mensah world-renowned scientist, inventor and first black person to obtain seven US patents in a space of six years.

Awards
Makori is a recipient of numerous awards, among them are the BBG Gold Medal Award and VOA's Superior Accomplishment Award.

References

External links
VOA News

Kenyan television journalists
Living people
Year of birth missing (living people)
People from Nairobi
University of Nairobi alumni
Moi University alumni